Bludov is a municipality and village in Kutná Hora District in the Central Bohemian Region of the Czech Republic. It has about 20 inhabitants.

History
The first written mention of Bludov is from 1550.

References

Villages in Kutná Hora District